Sarah Wiedenheft is a voice actress known for her voice work on English dubs of Japanese anime series and films associated with Funimation and Sentai Filmworks. Wiedenheft is known as the voice of Tohru from Miss Kobayashi's Dragon Maid, Phosphophyllite from Land of the Lustrous, Ruby Kurosawa from Love Live! Sunshine!!, Power from Chainsaw Man, Pony Tsunotori from My Hero Academia, Takagi from Teasing Master Takagi-san, Suika from Dr. Stone, Mage from Bikini Warriors, Non Toyoguchi from Keijo, Riri Hitotsuyanagi from Assault Lily, Rinka Urushiba from Tokyo ESP, Kiriha from Tsugumomo, Hina from Plunderer, Azusa Mursasaka from Orange, Aika Tenkubashi from Shomin Sample, Aika Tsube from Gonna be the Twintail, Sonia from Puzzle and Dragons X, and Akemi Soryuin from How Heavy Are the Dumbbells You Lift?.

Filmography

Anime

Film

Video games

References

External links 
 
 
 

Living people
Actresses from Fort Worth, Texas
American video game actresses
American voice actresses
Dutch actresses
Dutch emigrants to the United States
People from Amersfoort
21st-century American actresses
Year of birth missing (living people)